Ashley Harder (born July 29, 1986) is a former beauty queen from New Jersey. Ashley had held the title of Miss New Jersey USA and was to compete for the Miss USA title in 2007 before she resigned due to her pregnancy.  She works for WPSG, a CW TV affiliate in Philadelphia as one of the 3 hosts of the show "The CW Crew" according to the WPSG website.

Harder won the Miss New Jersey USA 2007 title in the state pageant held in Parsippany, New Jersey on 15 October 2006.  This was the first pageant she has competed in, and she beat two former Miss New Jersey Teen USA titleholders and one former Miss New Jersey titleholder to win the crown.  Harder was to have competed in the nationally televised Miss USA 2007 pageant, broadcast live from the Kodak Theatre in Hollywood, California on March 23, 2007.

Harder grew up in the Marlton section of Evesham Township, New Jersey and is a graduate of Camden Catholic High School in Cherry Hill who spent much of her high school years modelling and acting, including shoots for Versace, Pepsi and various bridal magazines.  She currently works for CW Philly 57, where she was hired in December 2005 to do on-air work and appearances with Justin Dugan and Sean Scott, who make up the station crew.  She has also briefly worked as a door girl for New York club "The Green Room".

Harder was crowned by outgoing titleholder and friend Jessica Boyington of Sicklerville.

Her "sister" 2007 titleholder was Alyssa Campanella, Miss New Jersey Teen USA.

Harder resigned her crown in January 2007 when she became pregnant (Miss USA contest rules prohibit participants from being pregnant or ever having given birth). Her title was assumed by the first runner-up, Erin Abrahamson.

Ashley gave birth to her first child, a daughter named Ava Marie on the morning of Sunday, July 29, 2007, which is also the day of Ashley's 21st birthday.

References

External links
Miss New Jersey USA official website
Miss USA official website

1986 births
Living people
Camden Catholic High School alumni
Miss USA 2007 delegates
People from Evesham Township, New Jersey